Lisa Bianchini (11 August 1867 – 18 March 1943) was a Swedish painter. Her work was part of the painting event in the art competition at the 1936 Summer Olympics.

References

Further reading 
 

1867 births
1943 deaths
20th-century Swedish painters
Swedish women painters
Olympic competitors in art competitions
Artists from Stockholm